Michael Carlsen (born 8 November 1963) is a Danish auto racing driver. Since its inaugural season in 1999 he has competed in the Danish Touring Car Championship. He is twice champion of the DTC in both 2000 and 2001 for his own Team Carlsen BP in a Peugeot 306. In his last full season in the DTC in 2008, raced in a Peugeot 407.

Career results

Complete TCR Denmark Touring Car Series results
(key) (Races in bold indicate pole position) (Races in italics indicate fastest lap)

* Season still in progress.

External links
 Profile at Driver Database.
 Official Site (Danish)
 DTC Official Site.

Living people
Danish racing drivers
Danish Touring Car Championship drivers
1963 births
24H Series drivers
20th-century Danish people
21st-century Danish people